Charles Gwathmey (June 19, 1938 – August 3, 2009) was an American architect. He was a principal at Gwathmey Siegel & Associates Architects, as well as one of the five architects identified as The New York Five in 1969. Gwathmey was perhaps best known for the 1992 renovation of Frank Lloyd Wright's Guggenheim Museum in New York City.

Born in Charlotte, North Carolina, he was the son of the American painter Robert Gwathmey and photographer Rosalie Gwathmey. He attended the High School of Music and Art in New York City, graduating in 1956. Charles Gwathmey attended the University of Pennsylvania and received his Master of Architecture degree in 1962 from Yale School of Architecture, where he won both the William Wirt Winchester Fellowship as the outstanding graduate and a Fulbright Grant. While at Yale, he studied under Paul Rudolph.

Gwathmey served as president of the board of trustees for The Institute for Architecture and Urban Studies and was elected a fellow of the American Institute of Architects in 1981.

Career

In 1965, while not yet a licensed architect, he designed a house and studio for his parents in Amagansett, New York, that became famous and revolutionized beach house design. When he did take the professional licensing exam, he was surprised to see a multiple-choice question on the test that asked "Which of these is the organic house?" The choices included the house he designed for his parents. He wanted to answer that the organic house was his, but in order to pass the exam he chose Frank Lloyd Wright's Fallingwater House. He knew that was the answer they wanted. He passed. By 1977, Gwathmey had designed 21 houses and renovations while still under 40 years old and ten years of practice. From 1965 through 1991, Gwathmey taught at Pratt Institute, Cooper Union for the Advancement of Science and Art, Princeton University, Columbia University, the University of Pennsylvania, the University of Texas, and the University of California at Los Angeles. He was Davenport Professor (1983 and 1999) and Bishop Professor (1991) at Yale, and the Eliot Noyes Visiting Professor at Harvard University (1985). Gwathmey was the Spring 2005 William A. Bernoudy Resident in Architecture at the American Academy in Rome

Gwathmey's firm designed the Museum Of Contemporary Art of North Miami, Florida in 1995, and the Astor Place Tower, a 21-story condominium project in Manhattan's East Village, in 2005. In 2011 the Ron Brown Building would serve as the new home of the United States Mission to the United Nations for which he was the lead architect. The building was dedicated to him. In her remarks, Ambassador Susan Rice thanked Gwathmey posthumously.

Personal life
His first marriage to Emily Margolin, a writer, ended in divorce. He had one child from that marriage, Annie Gwathmey. In 1974 Gwathmey married Bette-Ann Damson.

Gwathmey died of esophageal cancer on August 3, 2009, one day before the opening of Bay Lake Tower, one of his projects. He was 71. His wife donated his archives to Yale University in 2010.

Awards and honors
Gwathmey was the recipient of the Brunner Prize from the American Academy of Arts and Letters in 1970, and in 1976 he was elected to the academy. In 1983, he won the Medal of Honor from the New York Chapter of the American Institute of Architects and in 1985, he received the first Yale Alumni Arts Award from the Yale School of Architecture. In 1988 the Guild Hall Academy of Arts awarded Gwathmey its Lifetime Achievement Medal in Visual Arts, followed in 1990 by a Lifetime Achievement Award from the New York State Society of Architects. Gwathmey was the only architect named in the Leadership in America issue of Time magazine.

Completed projects

References
Notes

External links

1938 births
2009 deaths
20th-century American architects
Deaths from cancer in New York (state)
Columbia University faculty
Deaths from esophageal cancer
Harvard University staff
Pratt Institute faculty
Princeton University faculty
UCLA School of the Arts and Architecture faculty
University of Texas at Austin faculty
Yale School of Architecture alumni
Yale University faculty
The High School of Music & Art alumni
University of Pennsylvania School of Design alumni
Burials at Green River Cemetery
Fellows of the American Institute of Architects
Members of the American Academy of Arts and Letters